Yun Ji-hye (born 12 February 1983) is a South Korean table tennis player. She competed in the women's singles event at the 2004 Summer Olympics.

She married South Korean judo champion Lee Won-hee in 2018 and have a daughter together.

References

1983 births
Living people
South Korean female table tennis players
Olympic table tennis players of South Korea
Table tennis players at the 2004 Summer Olympics
Sportspeople from Seoul
21st-century South Korean women